Tell Bir Dakoue is an archaeological site at the junction of the road between Dakoue and Hoch Harime, 1 km north of the spring in the Beqaa Mohafazat (Governorate). It dates at least to the Early Bronze Age.

References

Baalbek District
Bronze Age sites in Lebanon